The 2009–10 UEFA Europa League was the first season of the UEFA Europa League, Europe's secondary club football tournament organised by UEFA. The competition was previously known as the UEFA Cup, which had been in existence for 38 years.

Spain's Atlético Madrid won the tournament for the first time, beating Fulham – who were playing in their first European final – at the Volksparkstadion, home ground of Hamburger SV, in Hamburg, Germany.

Shakhtar Donetsk were the defending champions but were eliminated by eventual finalists Fulham in the Round of 32.

Association team allocation
A total of 192 teams from 53 UEFA associations participated in the 2009–10 UEFA Europa League. Associations are allocated places according to their 2008 UEFA country coefficient, which takes into account their performance in European competitions from 2003–04 to 2007–08.

Below is the qualification scheme for the 2009–10 UEFA Europa League:
Associations 1–6 each enter three teams
Associations 7–9 each enter four teams
Associations 10–51 each enter three teams, except Liechtenstein (it organises only a domestic cup competition and no domestic league competition)
Associations 52–53 plus Liechtenstein each enter one team
The top three associations of the 2008–09 UEFA Fair Play ranking each gain an additional berth
Moreover, 33 teams eliminated from the 2009–10 UEFA Champions League are transferred to the Europa League

Association ranking

Notes
(FP): Additional fair play berth (Norway, Denmark, Scotland)
(UCL): Additional teams transferred from the UEFA Champions League

Distribution
Since the winners of the 2008–09 UEFA Cup, Shakhtar Donetsk, qualified for the 2009–10 UEFA Champions League through domestic performance, the title holder spot reserved for them in the group stage was vacated. As this was the first edition of the Europa League, it was initially unknown whether UEFA would simply disregard the vacant title holder spot and rearrange entries so that one more team would qualify from the play-off round, or replace the title holders' group stage place with that of the top-ranked association's cup winner and move teams from lower rounds appropriately, as the regulations are unclear on this matter. The former set-up was confirmed by UEFA's official list of participants, published on 16 June 2009. As a result, the following changes to the default allocation system were made to compensate for the vacant title holder spot in the group stage:
 The domestic cup winners of associations 16 and 17 (Switzerland and Bulgaria) were promoted from the third qualifying round to the play-off round.
 The domestic cup winners of associations 28 and 29 (Cyprus and Slovenia) were promoted from the second qualifying round to the third qualifying round.
 The domestic cup winners of associations 52 and 53 (Andorra and San Marino) and the domestic league runners-up of associations 35 and 36 (Republic of Ireland and Macedonia) were promoted from the first qualifying round to the second qualifying round.

Redistribution rules
A Europa League place is vacated when a team qualify for both the Champions League and the Europa League, or qualify for the Europa League by more than one method. When a place is vacated, it is redistributed within the national association by the following rules:
 When the domestic cup winners (considered as the "highest-placed" qualifier within the national association) also qualify for the Champions League, their Europa League place is vacated, and the remaining Europa League qualifiers are moved up one place, with the final place (with the earliest starting round) taken by the domestic cup runners-up, provided they do not already qualify for the Champions League or the Europa League. Otherwise, this place is taken by the highest-placed league finisher which do not qualify for the Europa League yet.
 When the domestic cup winners also qualify for the Europa League through league position, their place through the league position is vacated, and the Europa League qualifiers which finish lower in the league are moved up one place, with the final place taken by the highest-placed league finisher which do not qualify for the Europa League yet.
 A place vacated by the League Cup winners is taken by the highest-placed league finisher which do not qualify for the Europa League yet.
 A Fair Play place is taken by the highest-ranked team in the domestic Fair Play table which do not qualify for the Champions League or Europa League yet.

Teams
The labels in the parentheses show how each team qualified for the place of its starting round:
 CW: Cup winners
 CR: Cup runners-up
 LC: League Cup winners
 Nth: League position
 P-W: End-of-season European competition play-off winners
 FP: Fair play
 UCL: Relegated from the Champions League
 GS: Third-placed teams from the group stage
 PO: Losers from the play-off round
 Q3: Losers from the third qualifying round

Notes
TH Title Holder: Shakhtar Donetsk qualified for the UEFA Champions League as the runner-up of the 2008–09 Ukrainian Premier League. After losing in the Champions League third qualifying round, they entered the UEFA Europa League at the play-off round.
Armenia (ARM): Ararat Yerevan, which finished second in the 2008 Armenian Premier League, did not obtain a UEFA license, so Gandzasar, which finished third, were moved up to the second qualifying round, while Mika, which finished fourth, took the first qualifying round spot.
Bosnia and Herzegovina (BIH): Sloboda Tuzla, which finished third in the 2008–09 Premier League of Bosnia and Herzegovina, did not obtain a UEFA license, so Sarajevo, which finished fourth, were moved up to the second qualifying round. Borac Banja Luka, which finished fifth, also did not obtain a UEFA license, so Široki Brijeg, which finished sixth, took the first qualifying round spot.
Israel (ISR): 2008–09 Israel State Cup winners Beitar Jerusalem (which also finished third in the 2008–09 Israeli Premier League) did not obtain a UEFA license. Since Maccabi Haifa, the cup runners-up, qualified for the Champions League as the league champions, all three Israeli Europa League spots were redistributed based on league position, with second-placed Hapoel Tel Aviv moving up to the third qualifying round, fourth-placed Maccabi Netanya moving up to the second qualifying round, and fifth-placed Bnei Yehuda taking the first qualifying round spot.
Kazakhstan (KAZ): Almaty, the 2008 Kazakhstan Cup runners-up, merged with Megasport to form Lokomotiv Astana. However, the new club did not obtain a UEFA license. Following the denied license and withdrawal of three higher-placed teams in the 2008 Kazakhstan Premier League, Okzhetpes, which finished ninth, took the first qualifying round spot.
Latvia (LVA): Daugava Daugavpils, the 2008 Latvian Football Cup winners, merged with Dinaburg. Skonto, which finished third in the 2008 Latvian Higher League, were moved up to the second qualifying round, while Dinaburg, which finished fourth, took the first qualifying round spot.

Round and draw dates
All draws held at UEFA headquarters in Nyon, Switzerland unless stated otherwise.

Qualifying rounds

In the qualifying phase and the play-off round, teams play against each other over two legs on a home-and-away basis.

The draw for the first and second qualifying rounds, conducted by UEFA President Michel Platini and UEFA General Secretary David Taylor, was held on 22 June 2009, and the draw for the third qualifying round, conducted by UEFA Competitions Director Giorgio Marchetti and Head of Club Competitions Michael Heselschwerdt, was held on 17 July 2009. For the draws, clubs were separated into seeded and unseeded teams based on their club coefficient. Because the draws for the second and third qualifying rounds took place before the previous round was completed, the teams were seeded assuming the seeded side in the previous round would be victorious.

First qualifying round
The first legs were played on 2 July, and the second legs were played on 9 July 2009.

|-

|}

† Order of legs reversed after original draw

Second qualifying round
The first legs were played on 14 and 16 July, and the second legs were played on 23 July 2009.

Both the first and second legs between Bnei Yehuda and Dinaburg and between Rapid Wien and Vllaznia were under investigation by UEFA and German authorities for possible match-fixing.

|}

† Order of legs reversed after original draw

Third qualifying round
The first legs were played on 28 and 30 July, and the second legs were played on 4 and 6 August 2009.

The first leg between Fenerbahçe and Budapest Honvéd and the second leg between Interblock Ljubljana and Metalurh Donetsk were under investigation by UEFA and German authorities for possible match-fixing.

|}

† Order of legs reversed after original draw

Play-off round

The draw for the play-off round, conducted by UEFA General Secretary David Taylor and UEFA Competitions Director Giorgio Marchetti, was held on 7 August 2009. For the draw, clubs were separated into seeded and unseeded teams based on their club coefficient. The first legs were played on 20 August, and the second legs were played on 25 and 27 August 2009.

|}

† Order of legs reversed after original draw.

Note 1: The match was abandoned at 0–2 in the 88th minute after one Dinamo București fan entered the playing field and other fans invaded the running track around the pitch. The UEFA Control and Disciplinary Body awarded a default 0–3 defeat against Dinamo during an emergency meeting on 25 August. After advancing to the group stage, Dinamo were punished by having their first two home matches in the group stage played behind closed doors.

Group stage

The draw for the group stage was held at the Grimaldi Forum in Monaco on 28 August 2009. A total of 48 teams were drawn into twelve groups of four. Teams were divided into four pots, based on their club coefficient. Clubs from the same pot or the same association cannot be drawn into the same group.

A total of 24 associations were represented in the group stage. This was the first time teams from Latvia or Moldova qualified for the group stage of any European competition.

In each group, teams played against each other home-and-away. The matchdays were 17 September, 1 October, 22 October, 5 November, 2–3 December, and 16–17 December 2009. The top two in each group advanced to the knockout phase. If two or more teams are equal on points on completion of the group matches, the following criteria are applied to determine the rankings:
higher number of points obtained in the group matches played among the teams in question;
superior goal difference from the group matches played among the teams in question;
higher number of goals scored away from home in the group matches played among the teams in question;
superior goal difference from all group matches played;
higher number of goals scored;
higher number of coefficient points accumulated by the club in question, as well as its association, over the previous five seasons.

During this stage of the tournament, matches featured five on-field officials – with two additional officials monitoring play around the penalty area as part of a FIFA-sanctioned experiment.

Group A

Group B

Group C

Group D

Group E

Group F

Group G

Group H

Group I

Group J

Group K

Group L

Knockout phase

In the knockout phase, teams play against each other over two legs on a home-and-away basis, except for the one-match final.

The draw for the round of 32 and round of 16 was held on 18 December 2009, conducted by UEFA General Secretary Gianni Infantino and UEFA Director of Competitions Giorgio Marchetti. In the round of 32, the group winners and the four better third-placed teams from the Champions League group stage, which would play the second leg at home, were drawn against the group runners-up and the other four third-placed Champions League teams, with the restriction that teams from the same group or the same association cannot be drawn with each other. In the round of 16, there were no seedings, and teams from the same group or the same association may be drawn with each other.

The draw for the quarter-finals, semi-finals, and final (to determine the "home" team) was held on 19 March 2010, conducted by UEFA competitions director Giorgio Marchetti and the ambassador for the Hamburg final, Uwe Seeler. Same as the round of 16, there were no seedings, and teams from the same group or the same association may be drawn with each other.

Bracket

Round of 32
The first legs were played on 16 and 18 February, and the second legs were played on 23 and 25 February 2010.

Round of 16
The first legs were played on 11 March, and the second legs were played on 18 March 2010.

Quarter-finals
The first legs were played on 1 April, and the second legs were played on 8 April 2010.

Semi-finals
The first legs were played on 22 April, and the second legs were played on 29 April 2010.

Final

The final of the 2009–10 UEFA Europa League was played at the Volksparkstadion in Hamburg, Germany, on 12 May 2010. This was the second time the home stadium of Hamburger SV hosted a UEFA final, the first being the second leg of the 1982 UEFA Cup Final. Due to UEFA rules banning corporate sponsorship outside the confederation, the stadium was referred to by UEFA as "Hamburg Arena". The match was won by Atlético Madrid.

Statistics
Top scorers and assists (excluding qualifying rounds and play-off round):

Top goalscorers

Source: Top scorers . Retrieved 13 May 2010

Top assists

Source:

See also
 2009–10 UEFA Champions League
 2010 UEFA Super Cup

References

External links

2009–10 UEFA Europa League, UEFA.com

 
2
2009-10